Gol Darreh or Goldarreh or Galdarreh may refer to:
Gol Darreh, Alborz
Gol Darreh, Gilan
Gol Darreh, Malayer, Hamadan Province
Gol Darreh, Ilam
Gol Darreh, Isfahan
Gol Darreh, Kermanshah
Gol Darreh-ye Olya, Kermanshah
Gol Darreh-ye Sofla
Gol Darreh, Delfan, Lorestan Province
Gol Darreh, Khorramabad, Lorestan Province
Gol Darreh, Tehran